Shinwari may refer to:

Shinwari (Pashtun tribe), a Pashtun tribe found in Nangarhar and Parwan Provinces, Afghanistan.
Shinwari (surname)
Shinwar District, a district in Nangarhar Province, Afghanistan
Shinwari District, a district in Parwan Province, Afghanistan